The eleventh season of The Real Housewives of New York City, an American reality television series, is broadcast on Bravo. It premiered on March 6, 2019, and concluded on July 25, 2019. The series is primarily filmed in New York City. Its executive producers are Andrew Hoegl, Barrie Bernstein, Lisa Shannon, Pam Healy and Andy Cohen. The season focuses on the lives of Bethenny Frankel, Luann de Lesseps, Ramona Singer, Sonja Morgan, Dorinda Medley and Tinsley Mortimer.

This season marked the final appearance of original housewife Bethenny Frankel as she exited the show for a second time.

Cast and synopsis
Following completion of production on the tenth season, Carole Radziwill announced her departure from the series. In September 2018, Us Weekly reported that Barbara Kavovit would join the franchise; Kavovoit was previously heard during the seventh episode of the ninth season in an exchange with Radziwill. In an interview with the publication, Kavovit is an author, businesswoman and works in construction. She also has a degree in finance.

The eleventh season was announced to premiere on March 6, 2019, with all of the six remaining season ten housewives returning for the new installment; the season features the return of Zarin in a guest capacity and introduces Kavovit as a friend of the housewives.

Reunion seating arrangement

Episodes

References 

2019 American television seasons
New York City (season 11)